Low Water is a rock band based in Brooklyn, NY. Originally started in San Francisco, CA, the band relocated to the Williamsburg section of Brooklyn. The band's most recent cd is called, The Taste You Know and Enjoy. The songs "Voodoo Taxi", "She Shined Down" and "House In The City", appear in several episodes of PBS's documentary show Roadtrip Nation. The band consists of Johnny Leitera (Guitar/Vocals) D. Rubin (Guitar/Vocals) Turner Stough (Bass) and Joe Burch (drums). Johnny Leitera also plays with the Brooklyn band Tuff Sunshine.

The band created a mobile photobooth in order to produce a video for the song "Sister, Leave Me" from their second CD entitled "Who Said That Life Is Over?". The band's fourth CD, "The Taste You Know and Enjoy" was released on January 15, 2011, and has a seven-syllable title like the previous three CDs. The third track on the CD, "I Amplify", contains a Shepard tone at 1:00, and again at 2:07. The band discuses it in an interview with American Songwriter. The eighth track, "Centralia" is named after a ghost town in Pennsylvania which is the site of an underground mine fire. The song is a musical palindrome.

Former TechTV personalities Morgan Webb, Catherine Schwartz, Sarah Lane, Laura Swisher, Chi-Lan Lieu, and Sumi Das appeared in the band's music video Strange New Element. In addition to appearing in the video, Morgan, Chi-Lan and Laura are featured in the artwork of the band's first album, Hard Words In A Speakeasy.

In 2010 Leitera was American Songwriter Magazine's "Writer of the Week" while with Low Water.

Discography

Albums
 Hard Words In A Speakeasy (Yinz Playin' Music?, 2004)
 Who Said The Life Is Over? (Yinz Playin' Music?, 2006)
 Twisting The Neck Of The Swan (Yinz Playin' Music?, 2009)
 The Taste You Know and Enjoy (Yinz Playin' Music?, 2011)

External links
Low Water
Low Water on Spotify
Low Water - Facebook
Indierockcafe - Bands to Watch
Photobooth.net - Low Water video
Sister, Leaver Me (music video)
Strange New Element (music video)
American Songwriter - Writer Of The Week - Low Water
 "Low Water rising"
"Literate, rootsy trio Low Water" PGH CityPaper
"Low Water seeks high ground"
Low Water on Myspace

Indie rock musical groups from New York (state)
Musical groups from Brooklyn

References